Nairametrics is a Nigerian online newspaper that focuses on business and economic current affairs. It was established in 2013 by Obi-Chukwu Ugodre as a product of Nairametrics Financial Advocates Limited. They provide access to macroeconomic data, corporate finance data, consumer price data, and pricing analytics.

Awards 

|-
! scope="row" | 2021
| GAGE Awards
| Blog of the year
| 
|
|-
! scope="row" | 2022
| GAGE Awards
| Blog of the year
| 
|

References 

Nigerian news websites
2015 establishments in Nigeria
Online newspapers published in Nigeria